Disney Streaming (formerly known as BAMTech Media from 2015 to 2018, and Disney Streaming Services from 2018 to 2021) is a technology subsidiary of The Walt Disney Company located in Manhattan, New York City. It was established in 2015 as a spin-off of MLB Advanced Media—the digital media arm of Major League Baseball, focused on providing streaming video technology, particularly for over-the-top content (OTT) services. The company's major clients include ESPN (for its ESPN+ and ESPN3 services), the National Hockey League, and TheBlaze.

It was majority owned by MLB Advanced Media (which is, in turn, a consortium of MLB's principal team owners), with minority stakes held by the NHL and other investors. Disney acquired a minority stake in the company in August 2016 for $1 billion, and the following year, announced its intent to increase its stake to a 75% controlling stake for $1.58 billion. The deal was approved by regulators in September 2017. With the acquisition of BAMTech by Disney, the company began to develop two subscription streaming services aligned with Disney properties: the sports-oriented service, ESPN+, and the global family entertainment service, Disney+; United States general entertainment service Hulu and Latin America general entertainment service Star+ were later transferred into the company in August 2021. Disney had acquired sole ownership by November 2022.

History

BAMTech Media (2015–2018) 

BAMTech was founded in February 2015 through MLB Advanced Media, spinning-out its streaming technology business into a separate company with outside investors. The formation of the company was approved by MLB Advanced Media's board of directors on August 13, 2015. Under the plan, MLB-specific properties (such as MLB.com) would remain under league control. In August 2016, The Walt Disney Company acquired a 1/3 stake in the company for $1 billion, with an option to acquire a majority stake in the future.

On November 1, 2016, BAMTech announced a partnership with Discovery Communications to form a European joint venture known as BAMTech Europe. Its first client is Eurosport, the pan-European rights holder of the Olympic Games beginning 2018. The following month, Riot Games announced a deal with BAMTech for the company to distribute and monetize broadcasts of professional competitions in its multiplayer video game League of Legends through 2023, under which BAMTech would pay Riot at least $50 million per-year, and split advertising revenue. However, after multiple delays, the deal was shelved in 2018 (with Riot instead entering into a non-exclusive distribution deal with ESPN+ to include its content on the platform).

On February 21, 2017, Michael Paull was named BAMTech's CEO. On August 8, 2017, Disney announced that it would increase its ownership in the company to a 75% controlling stake for $1.58 billion. Disney also reiterated its plan to launch an ESPN-branded over-the-top service in early-2018 followed by a Disney-branded direct-to-consumer streaming service in 2019. BAMTech Media was placed under Kevin A. Mayer, Disney's senior executive vice president and chief strategy officer.

The company formally launched a website and corporate identity in September 2017. On November 7, 2017, BAMTech acquired the Manchester-based software firm Cake Solutions. As part of the corporate re-structuring, former director of Cake Solutions, Ian Brookes departed the company.

Disney Streaming Services (2018–2021) 

In Disney's March 14, 2018, segment reorganization in anticipation of integrating Fox assets, BAMTech was transferred to Walt Disney Direct-to-Consumer & International. BAMTech named Kevin Swint as senior vice-president and general manager of the Disney forthcoming streaming service in January 2018 with Agnes Chu as programming executive.

In October 2018, it was reported that the company had been internally renamed Disney Streaming Services. On October 31, 2018, ESPN International executive vice-president and managing director Russell Wolff was named executive vice-president and general manager of ESPN+. WWE did not renew its contract with BAMTech when it expired at the end of 2018, and signed a deal with Endeavor Streaming in January 2019.

Disney Streaming (2021–present) 
On August 3, 2021, Disney announced on Twitter that the company was renamed as Disney Streaming. In the same month, it was reported that Disney was purchasing the NHL's 10% ownership stake in Disney Streaming Services for $350 million, giving Disney a 85% ownership stake and that Major League Baseball's 15% stake in the company could be purchased by Disney, as soon as 2022.

On August 10, 2022, it was reported that Disney Streaming had a total of 221 million subscriptions from Disney+, Hulu and ESPN+ combined. At the time, this number surpassed Netflix, which reported having 220.7 million subscribers as of July 2022. On November 29, 2022, Disney revealed in their annual report that they had acquired MLB's remaining 15% stake in the company for $900 million.

References

External links
 

2015 establishments in New York City
2016 mergers and acquisitions
American companies established in 2015
Companies based in Manhattan
Corporate spin-offs
Disney acquisitions
Entertainment companies based in New York City
Entertainment companies established in 2015
Internet properties established in 2015
Mass media companies established in 2015
Online mass media companies of the United States
The Walt Disney Company subsidiaries